The 2018 World Rugby Americas Pacific Challenge was the third tournament of the Americas Pacific Challenge, which is a development competition for the Americas and Pacific island nations. The competition was hosted by Uruguay with all games played at the 14,000 capacity stadium Estadio Charrúa in Montevideo. Samoa A won the tournament for the first time, winning all three of their matches.

Format
With six teams in the tournament and a limitation of three matches per team, a "split pool" format was used. The field was split into two pools, with teams in one pool only playing the teams in the other. The competing teams were:

Pool A

Pool B

Table
Final standings for combined pools:

Fixtures
All times are local UYT (UTC-03)

The matches were announced on 22 August 2018.

Round 1

Round 2

Round 3

See also
 2018 end-of-year rugby union internationals
 Americas Rugby Championship
 World Rugby Pacific Challenge

References

World Rugby Americas Pacific Challenge
Americas Pacific
2018 in Tongan rugby union
2018 in Samoan rugby union
2018 in Uruguayan sport
2018 in Argentine rugby union
2018 in Canadian rugby union
2018 in American rugby union
International rugby union competitions hosted by Uruguay